Verkhnyaya Kema is a rural locality (a settlement) in Kemskoye Rural Settlement, Nikolsky District, Vologda Oblast, Russia. The population was 50 as of 2002.

Geography 
Verkhnyaya Kema is located 61 km northwest of Nikolsk (the district's administrative centre) by road. Kostylevo is the nearest rural locality.

References 

Rural localities in Nikolsky District, Vologda Oblast